Zbigniew Morsztyn (Morstin, Morstyn) (ca. 1628 – December 13, 1689) was a Polish poet.

Morsztyn was born in Kraków. For nine years (1648-1657) he served in the army, and fought against the Swedes and Russians during the Northern Wars. His most celebrated work was religious poetry, contrasting with the style of his cousin, Jan Andrzej Morsztyn.

Morsztyn was a member of a Christian sect called the Polish Brethren, which existed from 1562 to 1658. Due to religious persecution  in Poland Morsztyn fled in 1662 to the Duchy of Prussia (since 1618 in personal union with the Margraviate of Brandenburg)  where he became a Ducal Councillor of Frederick William, Elector of Brandenburg. With the help of Radziwill he  leased Stara Rudówka (Rudowken) In 1669 Morsztyn became an administrator of the estates owned by the duchess Ludwika Karolina Radziwiłł. He died in Königsberg in 1689, and was buried in Stara Rudówka the following year.

References 

1628 births
1689 deaths
Writers from Kraków
Polish poets
People from the Kingdom of Prussia
Writers from Königsberg
Zbigniew
Military personnel of the Polish–Lithuanian Commonwealth